Vasileios is a Greek word meaning "royal", or "kingly". It may refer to:

Places
Agios Vasileios, Achaea, village in the municipal unit of Rio, in Achaea, Greece
Agios Vasileios, Corinthia, village in the municipal unit of Tenea, in Corinthia, Greece

People
Vasileios Christopoulos (born 1951), Greek writer
Vasileios Demetis (born 1983), Greek swimmer
Vasileios of Dryinoupolis (1858–1936), religious figure in the Greek Orthodox church in Northern Epirus
Vasileios Polymeros (born 1976), Greek rower
Vasileios Pliatsikas (born 1988), Greek footballer
Vasileios Spanoulis (born 1982), Greek professional basketball player
Vasileios Theodoridis, Greek journalist

Greek masculine given names